The Rural Municipality of Lone Tree No. 18 is a rural municipality (RM) in the Canadian province of Saskatchewan within Census Division No. 4 and  Division No. 3. Located in the southwest portion of the province, it is southwest of the City of Swift Current. It is adjacent to the United States border, neighbouring Blaine County and Phillips County in Montana.

History 
The RM of Lone Tree No. 18 incorporated as a rural municipality on December 8, 1913. It was named for Lonetree Lake, whose signature tree was chopped down in 1918. This name was once further rearranged to form Treelon, a post office which operated in the municipality until 1945.

Geography

Communities and localities 
The following urban municipalities are surrounded by the RM.

Villages
Bracken
Climax

The following unincorporated communities are within the RM.

Localities
Canuck
Treelon

Demographics 

Government 
The RM of Lone Tree No. 18 is governed by an elected municipal council and an appointed administrator that meets on the third Wednesday of every month. The reeve of the RM is Roger Goodall while its administrator is Marla Shirley. The RM's office is located in Climax.

Transportation

See also 
List of rural municipalities in Saskatchewan

References 

Lone Tree

Division No. 4, Saskatchewan